Anthony John "Tony" Green (born 29 January 1939) is an English sports commentator and television presenter.

Darts career 

A former amateur player, who played county darts for Lancashire, he was the BBC's lead commentator when they showed the annual BDO World Professional Darts Championship.

In his capacity as a British Darts Organisation (BDO) official, he was a protagonist in the dispute which resulted in the formation of the rival governing body, the Professional Darts Corporation. He is also a former chair of the International Darts Players' Association (IDPA), the 'players' union' for those who remained with the BDO.

Broadcasting career 

Green and Sid Waddell were the darts commentators on the BBC from 1978 to 1994. Waddell left the BBC in 1994, but Green remained until the 2016 Lakeside World Professional Darts Championships, the last one televised by the BBC.

Green was well known as the announcer and co-host of the popular television darts quiz Bullseye, produced by Central for ITV from 1982–1995, and returned in the new version of the show which aired from April 2006, produced by Granada Productions for Challenge. He reprised his role of 'scorer' on a special edition of Bullseye which aired as part of the Gameshow Marathon series and was broadcast on ITV on 19 May 2007.

On 18 and 19 May 2007, Green co-hosted Challenge TV's coverage of the inaugural PDC US Open tournament.

In 2010, Green took a career break while being successfully treated for cancer of the tongue.

In 2015, Green was narrator and commentator for the BBC's Let's Play Darts for Comic Relief.

References

External links 
 

1939 births
Living people
People from Kingston upon Hull
Game show announcers
British sports broadcasters
Darts commentators
Sportspeople from Kingston upon Hull
BBC sports presenters and reporters